5U or 5-U may refer to:

5U, a rack unit measurement
5U, IATA code for LADE (Lineas Aéreas del Estado)
FS-5U, a footswitch made by  Roland Corporation
CMIT 5 U, a shotgun microphone made by Schoeps

See also
U5 (disambiguation)